The fifth season of The L Word began airing on January 6, 2008 and ended on March 23, 2008. 12 episodes were produced.

Episodes

Production
Showtime picked up a fifth season of The L Word for 12 episodes, touting the show as "a signature franchise among our viewers".  Production began in Vancouver the summer of 2007 and ended in Los Angeles early November 2007.

References

The L Word
2008 American television seasons